Zukowski or Żukowski (feminine: Żukowska; plural: Żukowscy) is a Polish surname. It is related to the following surnames in other languages:

People
 Anna Maria Żukowska (born 1983), Polish politician
 Charles Zukowski (born 1959), American engineer
 Christine Zukowski (born 1989), American figure skater
 Feliks Żukowski (1904–1976), Polish actor
 Jan Żukowski (born 1947), Polish sprint canoer
 Krzysztof Żukowski (born 1985), Polish footballer
 Marek Żukowski (born 1952), Polish theoretical physicist
 Mateusz Żukowski (born 2001), Polish football player
 Otton Mieczysław Żukowski (1867–1942), Polish composer
 Robert K. Zukowski (1930–2015), American politician
 Sharon Zukowski (1954–2015), American novelist
 Wojciech Żukowski (born 1964), Polish politician

See also
 
 
 Rolf Zuckowski (born 1947), German singer-songwriter

Polish-language surnames